Corneanu is a Romanian surname that may refer to:

 Nicolae Corneanu (1923 - 2014), a Romanian metropolitan bishop of the Romanian Orthodox Church
 Leonid Corneanu (1909 - 1957), a Moldovan poet, playwright and folklorist
 Corneanu, a village in Odăile Commune, Buzău County, Romania

See also 
 Cornel (disambiguation)
 Cornelia (disambiguation)
 Cornu (disambiguation)
 Corni (disambiguation)
 Cornea (disambiguation)
 Cornetu (disambiguation)
 Cornățel (disambiguation)
 Cornești (disambiguation)

Romanian-language surnames